Walter Villa (born 13 August 1943 - 18 June 2002) was an Italian four-time Grand Prix motorcycle road racing world champion. He was known for his quiet, unassuming nature off the bike who became a ruthless competitor once the races began.

Motorcycle racing career
Villa was born in Castelnuovo Rangone in the Emilia-Romagna region of Italy, between Maranello and Modena, the heart of Italian motor sport country. Villa began racing at 13, on a 175cc Moto Morini. In his first race, he finished third, beating Giacomo Agostini, who went on to become Italy's greatest-ever bike racer.

In the early 1970s, Harley-Davidson bought the ailing Aermacchi factory near Milan, with the aim of selling a range of bikes from 125cc machines to complement the traditional big V-twins built in the USA. First, they marketed Aermacchi's horizontal single cylinder four-strokes, and then began to develop their own two-strokes.

The Aermacchi  / Harley-Davidson factory hired Walter Villa for their racing effort in the Grand Prix motorcycle racing circuit after the death of Renzo Pasolini at Monza in May 1973. During the winter of 1973 -1974, the factory under the direction of Dr. Sandro Colombo, made huge progress in developing their machines in order to compete with Yamaha. This progress allowed Villa to take victory in the 1974 championship, with Villa winning the first 250 cc championship race of the year - in Italy by 45 seconds.

He went on to win the 1975 and 1976 250cc world championship together with the 350cc title in 1976.

In addition to the four World titles, he won eight Italian Championships. After he retired at the end of the 1980 season, Villa became a key player in the grand prix historic motorsport circuit, riding in high speed demonstrations in addition to becoming his country's top trainer.

He died of a heart attack, aged 58, on 18 June 2002.

Grand Prix motorcycle racing results 
Points system from 1950 to 1968:

Points system from 1969 onwards:

(key) (Races in bold indicate pole position; races in italics indicate fastest lap)

References 

Italian motorcycle racers
350cc World Championship riders
250cc World Championship riders
125cc World Championship riders
Sportspeople from the Province of Modena
1943 births
2002 deaths
250cc World Riders' Champions
350cc World Riders' Champions